County Road 367 is  long and runs between Karvik and Sekkemo in the municipality of Kvænangen in Troms og Finnmark County, Norway. Until the Sørstraumen Bridge was opened in the summer of 1980, the road was part of European route E6.

References

External links
Statens vegvesen – trafikkmeldinger Fv367 (Traffic Information: County Road 367)

367